Palaeogadus is an extinct genus of prehistoric bony fish.
Ecology: nektonic carnivore

Environments: marine (4 collections), (1), coastal (1), estuary/bay (1)

Age range: 61.7 to 11.608 Ma

Distribution:

• Miocene of Azerbaijan (1 collection), Germany (1)

• Oligocene to Miocene of Georgia (1)

• Oligocene of Germany (2), Poland (1)

• Paleocene of Denmark (4)

See also

 Prehistoric fish
 List of prehistoric bony fish

References

Prehistoric bony fish genera